The 2009–10 season of Olympique de Marseille (OM) had the club being involved in five competitions: the Ligue 1, the Coupe de France, the Coupe de la Ligue, the UEFA Champions League, and the UEFA Europa League. They won the Ligue 1 for the first time in 18 years. They also won the Coupe de la Ligue. In the UEFA Champions League, they were eliminated in the group stage. They finished third and were given a place in the UEFA Europa League knockout stages. They were eliminated in the round of 16 by Benfica.

Club

Coaching staff

Kit
This new season Adidas introduced Marseille's new kits, and these new ones are very different from last season, except the home kit, the colours of Marseille still stay white and sky blue. The away kit is an impressive kit with it being sky blue and has shades of black. The third kit was so far used in European competitions only. This kit is a full black kit but still has a little sky blue. In all of Marseille's kits there is one their main colour sky blue one.

Supplier : Adidas

Sponsor : Direct Energie

Other information

Squad
The professional staff of the 2009–10 season, led by Deschamps and his assistant Guy Stéphan, has eight home-grown players. 13 are international players in the team, including two France team members. The goalkeeping coach is Laurent Spinosi, who has four players under his wing, including Steve Mandanda, one of the current choices of the France national team. Taye Taiwo and Mamadou Niang are the longest tenured OM players, with 193 and 179 games played, respectively, as of 25 June 2009.

First-team squad

Updated 15 May 2010.

Out on loan

Reserve squad
Updated 8 February 2010.

Statistics

Overall
Last updated on 15 May 2010

Squad stats
The list is sorted by position and total appearances.

Last updated on 15 May 2010.

|-
|colspan="14" align="center"|Goalkeepers

|-
|colspan="14" align="center"|Defenders

|-
|colspan="14" align="center"|Midfielders

|-
|colspan="14" align="center"|Forwards

|-
|colspan="14"|Player(s) who left the club after the start of the season:

|}

Friendlies

Pre-season friendlies
Marseille started their season with six pre-season friendlies; they won four, drew one, and lost one. During these friendlies, they scored eight goals and only conceded four. Mamadou Niang, Brandão, Hatem Ben Arfa, and Stéphane Mbia each scored a goal while Bakari Koné and Taye Taiwo scored two goals each.

Other friendlies

Competitions

Overall

Ligue 1

Marseille started their Ligue 1 campaign with an impressive 2–0 victory and continued through a very fine form usually never being below 6th so they did have some very hard times, dropping points and losing or drawing important games but soon after they were flying high and now after 30 games, l'OM tops the Ligue 1 with a game in hand. Now that it has reached the firing line in the league, Marseille are in the lead but there are many challengers for the Ligue 1 with only 3 points splitting the top five teams.

League table

Results summary

Results by round

Matches

Coupe de France

Marseille entered the Coupe de France in the round of 64 some other Ligue 1 sides. They won their first game against Trélissac thanks to Ben Arfa and Cheyrou. Marseille's next game in the Coupe de France is against Lens a team that they lost to in 2009–10 Ligue 1. l'OM lost the round of 32 clash being knockout at the same round last season when they lost to Lyon but this time it was against Lens.

Coupe de la Ligue

Marseille started their Coupe de la Ligue campaign in the round of 16 where they came up against a team that they drew with in Ligue 1 but instead they were focused this time and determined to stay in this competition so they beat Saint-Étienne at the very last moment with a Niang goal in the 90+4-minute. In the quarter finals Marseille beat Lille then Toulouse FC after extra time in the semi-finals. For the final, l'OM will play against the winner of the match FC Lorient–Girondins de Bordeaux.

UEFA Champions League

Marseille were put into pot three in group C with two big football giants Real Madrid and Milan. Marseille started off poorly, losing their opening game at home to Milan. In their next game, Marseille also lost by a large margin, 3–0 to Real Madrid. Marseille had to win games if they are to stay in the Champions league and they did just that, winning against Swiss champions Zürich in both of their away and home matches. Marseille still continued their fine form but failed to get three points away at Italy. They could only earn one point, meaning that they must win their next clash against Real Madrid or else they are in the Europa League and also hope that Milan lose to Zürich, but it was not to be; Marseille lost 3–1 to Madrid, meaning that they will go into the Europa League as a seeded team.

Group C

UEFA Europa League

Because of Marseille's third-place finish at the 2009–10 UEFA Champions League, they were relegated to the Europa League along with other third-place finishers. The draw for the Europa League was made on 18 December 2009, and Marseille went up against Danish champions Copenhagen. Marseille easily went past the Danish champions in the Europa league, but then they had a very hard task ahead of them coming up against the 2008–09 Primeira Liga third-place finishers Benfica. After their double 3–1 wins, Marseille were favourites to progress to the quarter-finals.

Round of 32

Round of 16

National selection
The table shows the players selected to participate in National football matches for their countries. There were many International football competitions this season such as the 2010 FIFA World cup qualifications and other things such as the 2010 African Cup of Nations as well as international friendlies. Marseille have players who are often chosen to represent their countries in international football competitions and there are many who were chosen to represent their country in those competitions above.

Honours

Team
Ligue 1
 Winners
Coupe de la Ligue
 Winners

Individuals

References

Olympique de Marseille seasons
Marseille
French football championship-winning seasons